is a Japanese television reporter and actor. He is represented by Tender Pro.

Biography
He was born in Itabashi, Tokyo. He graduated from Yayoi Elementary School, Daiichi Junior High School, Koishikawa High School, and Waseda University Faculty of Political Science and Economics. His wife is professional golfer Masako Abe (maiden name: Isomura). Their eldest daughter Momoko Abe was selected as Miss Universe Japan in 2017 while working as a fashion model and tarento (celebrity). He currently lives in Urayasu, Chiba Prefecture.

He started his career as an actor in 1983 in the television drama Fukei-san wa Majo (Tokyo Broadcasting System) under the stage name , which he used during his early years as an actor. After appearing on the magazine Popeye as a model and acting in television dramas for around a decade, he turned to reporting starting with Big Morning (TBS).

Filmography

Modelling

Films

TV dramas

Informational programmes

Variety

Anime

Advertisements

Japanese dub

Music videos

Direct-to-video

Radio

Bibliography

References

External links
 

Japanese television journalists
Waseda University alumni
Male actors from Tokyo
1958 births
Living people